John Thompson MacCurdy or John Thomson MacCurdy (1886 – 1947) was a Canadian psychiatrist. He was the co-founder and first secretary of the American Psychoanalytic Association. He taught at Cornell University from 1913 to 1922, and in 1923 became a lecturer in psychopathology at Cambridge University.

Works
 The psychology of war, 1917. With a preface by W. H. R. Rivers
 War neuroses, 1918
 (ed.) Benign stupors: a study of a new manic-depressive reaction type by August Hoch
 Problems in dynamic psychology: a critique of psychoanalysis and suggested formulations, 1922
 The structure of emotion, mobid and normal, 1925
 Common principles in psychology and physiology, 1928
 Mind and money: a psychologist looks at the crisis, 1932
 The structure of morale, 1943
 Germany, Russia and the future, 1944. Current Problems No. 23. Translated into French as L'Allemagne, la Russie le l'avenir: essai psycholoique, 1944

References

1886 births
1947 deaths
Canadian psychiatrists
Cornell University faculty
Academics of the University of Cambridge
Canadian expatriates in the United States
Canadian expatriates in the United Kingdom